Yohan Mollo (born 18 July 1989) is a French professional footballer who plays as a winger or right-back for Hyères.

Career

Youth career
Mollo began his football career with Olympique de Marseille in 1996, who were at the time attempting to bounce back from the bribery scandal the club had endured in the early 1990s. After spending nearly eight years in Marseille's youth system, Mollo had a one-year spell at local club Aubagne FC before moving to the principality-based side Monaco.

Monaco
Just before the end of the 06–07 season, Mollo and Monaco agreed to terms on a professional contract with the player signing for three years.

Mollo was promoted to the first-team and handed the number 26 kit for the 2008–09 season. He made his professional debut on 18 October 2008 in a 1–2 loss to OGC Nice appearing as a substitute.

On 7 December 2009, Mollo signed his first professional contract with Monaco.

Krylia Sovetov Samara
In the summer of 2015, he joined Krylia Sovetov Samara in the Russian Football Premier League on loan. On 29 August 2015, in his second game and first start for Krylia Sovetov he assisted on all three goals as his new club unexpectedly defeated the reigning champion FC Zenit Saint Petersburg with a score of 3–1 in an away game. On 31 August 2016, he moved to Krylia Sovetov on a permanent basis.

Zenit St. Petersburg
On 10 January 2017, he signed a 3.5-year contract with Zenit Saint Petersburg on a €3 million transfer fee. Before the 2017–18 season, Zenit hired Roberto Mancini as their new manager and Mollo was moved to the second-tier farm-club FC Zenit-2 Saint Petersburg. On 26 July 2017, he brought attention on himself by showing the middle finger to Zenit Saint Petersburg fans when being substituted. On 30 August 2017, he was released from his Zenit contract by mutual consent.

Fulham
On 31 August 2017, Mollo signed for championship side Fulham, signing a two-year contract. On 30 January 2018, Fulham announced the mutual termination of Mollo's contract, after featuring just six times for the club during his five months, and failing to play a full 90 minutes once.

Return to Krylia Sovetov Samara
On 6 September 2018, he returned to Russia, rejoining Krylia Sovetov Samara on a one-year deal. He left Krylia Sovetov in January 2019.

Sochaux
On 28 January 2019, he signed with Sochaux until the end of the 2018–19 season.

Panathinaikos
On 25 July 2019, Mollo joined Panathinaikos on a two-year contract.

In January 2020 he joined Ligue 2 side US Orléans on loan for the rest of the season. He made six appearances while Orléans placed last in the league when the season was abandoned due to the COVID-19 pandemic.

On 23 October 2020, after 11 months he is again part of Panathinaikos' squad. Specifically, the French winger had played for last time on 24 November 2019 in a match against Panetolikos, as a late substitution. After a quarrel with club's coach Giorgos Donis, before a Super League match with Xanthi F.C. he was loaned out, to return in the summer of 2020, with ex- Panathinaikos coach Dani Poyatos not counting on him.

Personal life
Mollo is of half Italian, and half Romani descent. He is the cousin of André-Pierre Gignac.

Career statistics

References

External links

1989 births
Living people
People from Martigues
French Romani people
French people of Italian descent
French people of Romani descent
Sportspeople from Bouches-du-Rhône
French footballers
Footballers from Provence-Alpes-Côte d'Azur
Association football midfielders
Ligue 1 players
Ligue 2 players
Championnat National 2 players
Championnat National 3 players
La Liga players
Russian Premier League players
Russian First League players
English Football League players
Super League Greece players
AS Monaco FC players
Stade Malherbe Caen players
AS Nancy Lorraine players
AS Saint-Étienne players
Granada CF footballers
PFC Krylia Sovetov Samara players
FC Zenit Saint Petersburg players
FC Zenit-2 Saint Petersburg players
Fulham F.C. players
Al-Rayyan SC players
FC Sochaux-Montbéliard players
Panathinaikos F.C. players
US Orléans players
France under-21 international footballers
French expatriate footballers
French expatriate sportspeople in Spain
Expatriate footballers in Spain
French expatriate sportspeople in Russia
Expatriate footballers in Russia
French expatriate sportspeople in England
Expatriate footballers in England
French expatriate sportspeople in Qatar
Expatriate footballers in Qatar
French expatriate sportspeople in Greece
Expatriate footballers in Greece